Peter Yates (19 July 1920 – 16 November 1982) was a British born artist and architect. Yates was best known for his partnership with Gordon Ryder in the North of England architectural firm, Ryder and Yates.

Biography

Early life and education
Peter Yates was born in Leytonstone, East London in 1920. He was attracted to the visual arts at an early age, winning a painting competition in Chicks' Own in 1925. Whilst at Wanstead School from September 1934 to July 1936, he painted a mural, Events at Sea.

Peter worked as a furniture and model maker during 1937 before attending the London Polytechnic School of Architecture, studying under Sir Hubert Bennett, Peter Moro and Robin Day from January 1938 to April 1941.

Career

War years
Peter Yates served as a fireman on the St Paul's Watch in early 1941, during which he painted Wren's churches during the London Blitz. He met the antiquary and architectural historian, Gerald Cobb, while drawing in Ludgate Circus and they became lifelong friends. Peter joined the RAF in July 1941 and was stationed in Wales and Ireland before going to Versailles in 1944 with the Supreme Headquarters Allied Expeditionary Forces.

Peter Yates lived in Paris following the war where he met many artists and writers, including Georges Braque, Édouard Pignon, Jaime Sabartes, Juliette Gréco, Leon Gischia, Gertrude Stein, Alice Toklas, Andre L'Hote, Sylvia Beach and Le Corbusier.

Early practice
Peter Yates and Clive Entwistle were invited to work on plans for a new UNO building in New York by Le Corbusier.

Pyramid Project for the New Crystal Palace with Clive Entwhistle at Ove Arup's office, Soho 1947.

Masterplan for Peterlee new town with Berthold Lubetkin in 1948 (where Peter Yates first met Gordon Ryder).

Peter Yates returned to Paris in 1950 as Chief Designer at Unité d’Informations Visuelles, a commercial art studio located in the Old Alhambra night club in the gardens of the Champs Élysées. From here, he contributed to exhibitions across Europe. These included Europa Zug  and Atoms for Peace.

Ryder and Yates
In 1953, after a chance meeting in London, Peter Yates moved to Newcastle upon Tyne to form an architectural practice with Gordon Ryder. Initial work included exhibition design and soon progressed onto a series of private domestic architectural commissions. A new multidisciplinary approach which included engineers fuelled their progress. Their buildings were highly regarded. Large scale commissions for industrial complexes for British Gas, Sterling Organics and others followed. Social projects in Newcastle and Sunderland for the Salvation Army, a large social housing project in Kenton as well as various local government and healthcare projects. Ryder and Yates' extensive portfolio of acclaimed buildings won numerous architectural awards over the following three decades from their inception in 1953.

'Ryder and Yates were Lubetkin's sole professional heirs – a legacy mutually recognised – and their work is a compelling reminder of Lubetkin's lesson that the poetic and the rational were inextricable impulses in modern architecture's original vision.' John Allan, Director of Avanti Architects.

A book about Ryder and Yates was published as part of the RIBA 20th Century Architects series.

Notable Ryder and Yates buildings include:
R H Patterson Ford Dealer, Newcastle upon Tyne, 1964
North Kenton Housing Scheme (subsequently known as the Kenton Bar Estate), Newcastle upon Tyne, 1964
Norgas House, Killingworth, 1965
Engineering Gas Research Station (ERS), 1967
The Citadel, Killingworth, 1967
Sterling Organics, Dudley, 1972
Northern Gas Computer Centre, Killingworth, 1974
Salvation Army 'Men's Palace', Newcastle upon Tyne, 1974
MEA House, Newcastle upon Tyne, 1976
The On-line Inspection Centre (OLI), Cramlington, 1979
Studio 5, Tyne Tees Television, Newcastle upon Tyne, 1981
Salvation Army, Sunderland, 1982
Vickers, Newcastle and Leeds, 1982

Marriage and children
Peter Yates married musician Helen Maud Southgate from New Zealand in 1958 and had five children. Helen died in 1972.

Peter married his second wife Gillian Jessica Eden in 1976. Gillian died in 2015.

Death and afterward
Peter Yates died in 1982.

Influences
Peter's main influences were Le Corbusier and Berthold Lubetkin. Other influences were though his friendships with Austin Wright, Kenneth Rowntree and Diana Rowntree, Dennis Flanders and others.

Peter Yates nominated and successfully campaigned for Berthold Lubetkin to be awarded the Royal Gold Medal for Architecture, 1982

Peter Yates curated an exhibition of Le Corbusier Lithographs at the Ferens Art Gallery, Hull in 1976

Murals 
Like Le Corbusier before him, Peter Yates hand painted murals in many buildings. Printed murals also appeared in several commercial interiors.

Public :
Bevin Court, London;
Lake with Dragonflies, Lloyds Bank, The Citadel, Killingworth;
Northern Rock Building Society, Newcastle upon Tyne;
Martin's Bank (now Lloyds Bank) interior, Priestpopple, Hexham;
Lettering in grey, white and black, R.H. Patterson, Ford Main Dealer;
Nonsuch Palace, Linden Hall, Northumberland;
Miner's Cafeteria, Peterlee;
Time, The Golden Egg Restaurant, Newcastle upon Tyne;
The Italian Mural, Castle Eden;
Shadows on the Wall, Tyneside Cinema, Newcastle upon Tyne;
Carbon Molecular Structures, Sterling Organics Reception, Dudley;
Origins of Gas, Gas Rig, Norgas House (Pierre Boucher);
Processions of Shells, Beacon House Lobby, Whitley Bay;
Flags, Tynemouth Sailing Club, Tynemouth.

Domestic :
Grand Parade, Tynemouth;
Trees, Woolsington;
Scotby, Cumbria.

Exhibitions
One man exhibitions:
1975 Ultramarinos, Colbert Gallery, Durham
1976 England! Colbert Gallery, London
1978 England 2, Downstairs Gallery, Newcastle upon Tyne
1979 Central Sea Paintings of the Mediterranean, Downstairs Gallery, Newcastle upon Tyne
1982 Paris! Pen Gallery, Blackheath, London
1982 The Lakes Bridge House Gallery, Coniston
1982 Cyclops Rock, Paintings of England, France, Spain, Italy and Greece Hatton Gallery, Newcastle upon Tyne
1983 Peter Yates Retrospective, Durham Light Infantry, Durham 
1985 England, France and Cyclops Rock, RIBA, London 
2010 Peter Yates British Landscapes, Margaret Howell, London 
2015 Peter Yates Paintings 1939-1982, Hatton Gallery, Newcastle upon Tyne

Group exhibitions:
Whitechapel Art Gallery (1942, 1943)
The Essex Art Club (1944, 45, 46, 47, 48, 49)
Royal Academy (1943)
Royal Society of Painters in Water Colours / Royal Watercolour Society (1943, 1944, 1946, 1982)
Shipley Art Gallery, Gateshead
Royal Institute of British Architects (1946)
Durham Images. Colbert Gallery, Durham
Wallsend Arts Centre
Hatton Gallery, Newcastle upon Tyne
RIBA NE Reinvigorating the Region (2010)

Works in private collections in Great Britain, Europe, USA and New Zealand

Further reading

Peter Yates – Le Corbusier, A Personal Appreciation, Northern Architect, September 1965
Peter Yates – RIBA Lecture, Architects approach to Architecture, 4 November 1975
Stephen Gardiner – Proclaiming the Winner : Call for more Architectural Competitions, Observer Review, 28 November 1976
Peter Yates – Ideas, Northern Architect, January 1976
Stephen Gardiner – V for Vickers, Observer Review, 1982
Stephen Gardiner – Yates on View, Observer, 22 September 1985
Allan, J. (1992) Bertold Lubetkin: Architecture and the tradition of progress, RIBA Publications, pp. 449–518.  
A. Peter Fawcett – Learning from Le Corbusier and Lubetkin: the work of Ryder and Yates. The Journal of Architecture, Volume 6, Issue 3 September 2001, pages 225 – 248 
Rutter Carroll – The Architecture of Ryder and Yates, The Twentieth Century Society, Spring 2004 Newsletter
Rutter Carroll – Ryder and Yates (RIBA Publications and the 20th Century Society, 2009)

References 

1920 births
1982 deaths
English muralists
20th-century English painters
English male painters
Architects from London
People from Leytonstone
20th-century English architects
People educated at Wanstead High School
Royal Air Force personnel of World War II
British firefighters
20th-century English male artists